Claude de Rye de la Palud, Baron of Valançon (c. 1576 – 24 March 1648) was a general officer of artillery in Flanders, in the service of Spain.

The second son of Philibert de Rye (1540–1597), count of Varax and of
La Roche-Saint-Hippolyte, baron of Balançon and of Romange, lord of Vuillefans, by his marriage to Claudine de Tournon-Roussillon, lady of Vassoulieu, Valançon was probably born at Bouligneux, Bresse.

Serving in a Burgundian regiment under the orders of his elder brother Christophe, he took part in the siege of Ostende (1601–1604) where he lost a leg on 26 July 1601. Thereafter he wore a wooden leg.

On 24 July 1602 his regiment was converted into a Tercio, and he succeeded his brother as "maestre de campo", thus becoming, although with interruptions, the commander of that unit for the next 23 years.

In 1620 he participated in the invasion of the Palatinate and on 14 November 1620 took part in the defence of Alzey, where his Burgundian Tercio managed to repel every enemy attack until it was relieved by Count Hendrik van den Berg, a cavalry general in the Army of the Palatinate. Valançon was also present at the Battle of Fleurus (29 August 1622), the siege of Bergen op Zoom, and the siege of Breda (1624–25), of which city he became governor until 1631.

That same year he was nominated Captain-General and Grand Master of Artillery in the Army of Flanders, replacing Hendrik van den Berg, who was now General of the Cavalry.

In 1635 Valançon ravaged the French regions of Artois and Picardy, commanding Croatian troops. In 1636, with 2,000 horse and 10,000 foot soldiers, he repelled a Dutch force sent to storm Juliers and Cleves, thereafter relieving Schenck, besieged by the Dutch.

Valançon kept his position in the Army until 1638, when he became a member of the War Council in Brussels. In 1645 he was designated to the post of Captain-General of Namur, living the last three years of his life in the castle of Namur, where he died in 1648.

Bibliography
 "Memorial histórico español. Colección de documentos, opusgulos y antigüedades que publica la Real Academia de la Historia". Madrid: Imprenta Nacional, 1861

External links
Balancon at tercios.org

1570s births
1648 deaths
Military history of Spain